Heishi may refer to:
Taira clan of Japan, also known as 
Heishe or heishi, disk-shaped shell, coral or turquoise beads, created by Pueblo people